Sea World station is an interchange station for Line 2 and Line 12 of the Shenzhen Metro. Line 2 platforms opened on 28 December 2010 and Line 12 platforms opened on 28 November 2022. It is located close to the eastern edge of Shekou in Nanshan district of Shenzhen.

The underground station is located adjacent to Sea World, a tourist attraction with numerous restaurants and a large ship Minghua. It is also located close to a number of offices and banks, the sea walk at Sea World promenade, and Times plaza, one of the oldest high rise office buildings in Shekou.

Station layout

Exits

References

External links
 Shenzhen Metro Sea World Station (Chinese)
 Shenzhen Metro Sea World Station (English)

Shenzhen Metro stations
Railway stations in Guangdong
Nanshan District, Shenzhen
Railway stations in China opened in 2010